The coat of arms of Barrie was granted by the College of Arms on 1 March 1977.  The grant included the full coat of arms as well as a flag and a badge, both derived from the arms.  The city registered the arms with the Canadian Heraldic Authority on 20 January 2005.

See also
Canadian heraldry
National symbols of Canada
List of Canadian provincial and territorial symbols
Heraldry

References

External links
Entry on the Public Register of Arms, Badges and Flags of Canada

Barrie
Barrie
Barrie
Barrie
Barrie
Barrie
Barrie
Barrie